In enzymology, a L-amino-acid dehydrogenase is an enzyme that catalyzes the chemical reaction

an L-amino acid + H2O + NAD+  a 2-oxo acid + NH3 + NADH + H+

The 3 substrates of this enzyme are L-amino acid, H2O, and NAD+, whereas its 4 products are 2-oxo acid, NH3, NADH, and H+.

This enzyme belongs to the family of oxidoreductases, specifically those acting on the CH-NH2 group of donors with NAD+ or NADP+ as acceptor.  The systematic name of this enzyme class is L-amino-acid:NAD+ oxidoreductase (deaminating).

References

 

EC 1.4.1
NADH-dependent enzymes
Enzymes of unknown structure